The action of 27 February 1809 was a minor naval engagement during the French Revolutionary Wars. Two 44-gun frigates, Pénélope and Pauline, sortied from Toulon harbour to chase a British frigate, HMS Proserpine, which was conducting surveillance of French movements. First sneaking undetected and later trying to pass herself as a British frigate coming to relieve Proserpine, Pénélope approached within gun range before being identified. With the help of Pauline, she subdued Proserpine and forced her to surrender after a one-hour fight.

Proserpine was sailed to Toulon and commissioned in the French Navy, where she served until 1865. Captain Otter remained a prisoner in France until the end of the war; he was court martialed for the loss of his ship on 30 May 1814, and honourably acquitted.

Background
By 1809, the French fleet in Toulon was blockaded by several British squadrons of powerful ships of the line; direct surveillance of the harbour, however, had to be conducted by smaller and more agile frigates. Threatening intervention from the battle squadrons against ships putting out to sea, the presence of the British frigates constricted the liberty of manoeuver of the French ships, preventing not only an all-out sortie, but also navigation of individual ships or small squadrons, and even the training manoeuvers necessary to maintain the fleet. Consequently, French commanders tried to drive off British ships in order to disrupt the surveillance.

In February, the 32-gun frigate HMS Proserpine, under Captain Charles Otter, was patrolling off Toulon. Having noticed that she tended to sail very close to Toulon, up to Cape Sicié, and learning from fishermen who had been in contact with her crew that she would be relieved at her station around the 27th, Captain Dubourdieu requested from Admiral Ganteaume authorisation to give chase; although under order to avoid engaging the British squadrons, Ganteaume authorised the sortie, joining Pauline, under François-Gilles Montfort, to Dubourdieu's Pénélope. He furthermore ordered two 74-guns, Suffren and Ajax, under Rear-admiral Baudin, to cover the frigates.

Battle
Pénélope and Pauline sneaked out of Toulon around 19:00, under a light East-North-East wind. Approaching unseen on the background of the coast, they reached Proserpine around 04.00, as she was cruising 12 miles off Cape Sicié. Suddenly detecting two large ships nearby, Proserpine, almost becalmed, tried to evade and identify her opponents to no avail. Seeing Proserpine challenge him with codes, Dubourdieu ordered the same number of signals to be raised and quickly lowered, as to confuse the British into wondering whether he was another British frigate coming to relieve her and having merely made a mistake in his answer. Pénélope arrived on the starboard side of Proserpine, " looking very large, her ports all up, lights on the main-deck fore and aft: she had shortened sail, and was perfectly ready for commencing the action", while Pauline took position on the port side.

Captain Otter hailed the frigates, who answered by firing a single shot. The ships began trading broadsides, Pénélope gaining an initial advantage by raking her opponent with a triple-shot broadside. After one hour, Proserpine had her rigging and hull seriously damaged, and was in danger of being boarded. Her Mizzen-mast was cut three metres above the deck, and she had also lost her main top spar.

Seeing his ship unable to flee and two 74-gun ships approaching, Otter consulted with his officers and struck his colours, surrendering at 05:15.

Aftermath

The incident did not alter the balance of power in the region. Pénélope  towed Proserpine to Toulon where the French Navy commissioned under her existing name. She took part in the Invasion of Algiers in 1830 and remained in service until 1865, when she was hulked and used as a prison.

Otter remained a prisoner in France until the end of the war; he was court martialed for the loss of his ship on 30 May 1814, and honourably acquitted, the court determining that he had defended his ship in the "most gallant and determined manner, and that her colours were not struck until resistance was of no avail".

Dubourdieu was promoted to Officer of the Legion of Honour.

Notes and references

Notes

References

Bibliography
 Clowes, William Laird, et al. The royal navy: a history from the earliest times to the present, Volume 3
 
 
 
 
 
 

Conflicts in 1809
Naval battles involving France
Naval battles involving the United Kingdom
Naval battles of the Napoleonic Wars
February 1809 events